Thomas F. Lewis (October 26, 1924 – August 1, 2003) was a Republican member of the United States House of Representatives from Florida.

Born in Philadelphia, Pennsylvania, Lewis attended the St. Edwards School and graduated from Central High School in 1942. During World War II, he served in the U.S. Army Air Forces as a gunner aboard a B-25 bomber, and continued service in the U.S. Air Force on the ground in the Korean War, being discharged at the rank of master sergeant in 1954.

Lewis attended Palm Beach Junior College, and graduated from the University of Florida with a business degree in 1959. For 17 years, he was an executive with the aircraft company Pratt & Whitney, followed by work in real estate investment. He entered politics in 1964 when he was elected councilman and mayor of North Palm Beach. He was elected to the Florida House of Representatives in 1972, where he served four terms, and to the Florida Senate in 1980. In 1982, he was first elected to the U.S. House of Representatives from Florida's 12th district (later the 16th district after redistricting in 1990), defeating Apollo 15 astronaut Alfred Worden in the Republican primary. He would be reelected five times before retiring in 1994.

Lewis died of heart failure following surgery on August 1, 2003, in Palm Beach Gardens, Florida. His wife, Marian, was also a Florida state legislator.

References

External links
 
 

1924 births
2003 deaths
20th-century American businesspeople
20th-century American politicians
United States Air Force personnel of the Korean War
American aviation businesspeople
Republican Party Florida state senators
Mayors of places in Florida
Republican Party members of the Florida House of Representatives
Military personnel from Philadelphia
Palm Beach State College alumni
People from North Palm Beach, Florida
Politicians from Philadelphia
Republican Party members of the United States House of Representatives from Florida
United States Army Air Forces personnel of World War II
Warrington College of Business alumni
Central High School (Philadelphia) alumni